Anna Maria della Pietà (c.1696 – 10 August 1782), was an Italian violinist, composer and teacher based in the Venetian orphanage Ospedale della Pietà.

Biography 

Her exact date of birth is unknown because Anna Maria was an orphan at the Ospedale della Pietà in Venice. The orphanage was established to raise girls who would be useful to society. Babies would be dropped off through a secret opening barely large enough for them, first created in 1696. She was called Anna Maria, though later known as Anna Maria dal Violin and Anna Maria della Pietà. By the time she was eight her musical prowess had brought her to the attention of the heads of the school. She was taught the violin by the school music director Antonio Vivaldi.

She in turn taught Chiara della Pietà and Santa della Pietà. Many of the concertos written by Antonio Vivaldi were written especially for her. Anna Maria remained at the orphanage her whole life. Her music brought tourists to hear the orchestra and her play.  An anonymous poet wrote that when she played countless angels dare to hover near. In 1720, at the age of 24, she was dubbed "Maestra", by 1737 Anna Maria had attained the leadership posts of maestra di violino and maestra di coro. Anna Maria also played the cello, oboe, lute, mandolin, harpsichord, viola d'amore. Anna Maria composed music and performed publicly for more than 60 years. She died of a fever and cough in Venice on 10 August 1782.

References and sources 

1696 births
1782 deaths
18th-century violinists
Italian classical violinists
Adoption, fostering, orphan care and displacement
Italian Baroque composers
Italian women classical composers
Musicians from Venice
18th-century Italian composers
Women classical violinists
18th-century women composers